Ansgar Wessling (born 3 May 1961) is a retired West German competition rower. Between 1988 and 1992, he won two world titles and two Olympic medals in the coxed eights event, as well as a silver in the coxed fours at the 1990 World Championships.

References

External links
 
 
 

1961 births
Living people
West German male rowers
German male rowers
Olympic rowers of West Germany
Olympic rowers of Germany
Olympic gold medalists for West Germany
Olympic bronze medalists for Germany
Olympic medalists in rowing
Rowers at the 1988 Summer Olympics
Rowers at the 1992 Summer Olympics
Medalists at the 1988 Summer Olympics
Medalists at the 1992 Summer Olympics
World Rowing Championships medalists for Germany
World Rowing Championships medalists for West Germany
Sportspeople from Essen